Absolwent is a Polish luxury vodka manufactured since 1995 by Polmos Białystok. Produced as a 4-fold rectified grain high-end spirit.
It occurs in several varieties: pure, flavor (such as lemon, apricot, cranberry and banana) and Absolwent Gin.
According to the company's report from 1999, Absolwent ranks fifth in the world. In 2005, it was the best-selling vodka in Poland in terms of sales (14% of the market). In 2012, Absolwent was the nineteenth most popular vodka in the world, by sales.

References

Polish vodkas
Białystok